Marie Gasquet (1872–1960) was a French regionist writer from Provence.

Biography

Early life
Marie Gasquet was born in Saint-Rémy-de-Provence, Bouches-du-Rhône in 1872. Her father, Marius Girard, was a Provençal poet. Her godfather was Frédéric Mistral.

Career
She moved to Paris where she worked for Flammarion and became a successful novelist. She was hailed as queen of the Felibrige in 1892.

Personal life
She was married to Joachim Gasquet, a friend of Paul Cézanne's.

She died in 1960.

Bibliography
Une Enfance provençale	
 Sainte Jeanne d'Arc ...
 Ce que les femmes disent des femmes
 Tante la Capucine
 Une Fille de saint François	
 La Fête-Dieu
 Capharnaüm
 Le Métier de Pénélope
 Sainte Bernadette de Lourdes
 La vénérable Anne-Madeleine Remuzat

References

1872 births
1960 deaths
People from Saint-Rémy-de-Provence
20th-century French women writers
20th-century French novelists